Psaroxantha basilica is a moth of the family Oecophoridae. It is known from New South Wales and Queensland.

References

Oecophorinae